Dave Bike (born March 14, 1946) was the former men's head basketball coach at Sacred Heart University.  He led the Pioneers to a Division II national championship in 1986, and oversaw the transition of the program to the Division I level. He retired on May 30, 2013, after a 35-year career. Ryan Dawley, his long time assistant and mentee took over as head coach for the Pioneers.

References

1946 births
Living people
Basketball coaches from Connecticut
Sacred Heart Pioneers athletic directors
Sacred Heart Pioneers men's basketball coaches
Sacred Heart University alumni 
Seattle Redhawks men's basketball coaches
Sportspeople from Bridgeport, Connecticut
University of Notre Dame alumni